During the 1982–83 English football season, Arsenal F.C. competed in the Football League First Division.

Season summary 

Arsenal had earned a place in the UEFA Cup with a fifth-place finish despite having recently lost some key players. Manchester United had snapped-up Frank Stapleton in 1981, while Liam Brady had moved to Juventus a year earlier. So in some respects this was still a side looking to find itself.

Arsenal finished in mid table at 10th after being in the lower reaches of the league for much of the season. Arsenal reached the semi-finals of the FA Cup and League Cup but on both occasions were beaten by Manchester United. Arsenal’s foray into the 1982-83 UEFA Cup was short as they lost 8-4 on aggregate to Spartak Moscow, including a 5-2 drubbing at Highbury. Arsenal fans demonstrated that they could appreciate fine football for what it was. As the final whistle sounded, the Arsenal fans were applauding the Russians off the pitch, the show of admiration was so remarkable that the Spartak players reappeared on the centre circle to acknowledge the crowd.

37 year old Pat Jennings became the first player in English football to appear in 1,000 first team matches. He reached this milestone against West Bromwich Albion on 26 February 1983. Jennings found himself out of favour at Arsenal in 1982 as Scottish keeper George Wood assumed the No 1 spot in half of the games of the season.

Squad

Results

First Division

Football League Cup

FA Cup

Arsenal entered the FA Cup in the third round proper, in which they were drawn to face Bolton Wanderers.

UEFA Cup

Top scorers

First Division
  Tony Woodcock 14
  Brian Talbot 9
  Graham Rix 6
  Alan Sunderland 6

References

External links
 Arsenal 1982–83 on statto.com

Arsenal
Arsenal F.C. seasons